Wiązów  is a town in Strzelin County, Lower Silesian Voivodeship, in south-western Poland. It is the seat of the administrative district (gmina) called Gmina Wiązów.

As at 2019, the town has a population of 2,241.

Etymology
The exact origins of the etymology of the town of Wiązów are left unknown, with such, two theories have been formed. The first of which states the settlement's name originates from the Polish word for elm, wiąz, the other states the town's name comes from the word for snakes węże. Both are documented by Silesian writer Konstanty Damrot, in his 1896 publication documenting Silesian names, published in Bytom - "von wiąz - Ulme" (...) auch von wąż - die Schlange (...)."''

See also
History of Silesia

References

Cities and towns in Lower Silesian Voivodeship
Strzelin County